The 1976 United States Olympic trials for track and field were held June 19–27 at Hayward Field in Eugene, Oregon. These were the last organized by the Amateur Athletic Union (AAU); the Amateur Sports Act of 1978 was passed two years later which formed the new national governing body for the sport of track and field, The Athletics Congress.  The 1970s was a transitional period where amateur athletes were seeking ways to be paid for their athletic efforts.  Many athletes had sacrificed their eligibility to run professionally, others made the attempt and were in transition to regain their amateur status.

The trials for the men's marathon was held in Eugene a month earlier on May 22. The longest race for women at the 1976 Olympics was the 1500 meters, but eventual Olympic marathoners Joan Benoit, Julie Brown, and Francie Larrieu all participated.

For the first time, the men's 50 km race walk was not part of the Olympics, but returned in 1980.

High school athletes Houston McTear, Dwayne Evans, Chandra Cheeseborough, Sheila Ingram, Rhonda Brady, Paula Girven, and Kathy McMillan were successful in these trials.

Men's results
Key:
.

Men track events

Men field events

Women's results

Women track events

Women field events

Notes

References

US Olympic Trials
Track, Outdoor
United States Summer Olympics Trials
Olympic Trials (track and field)
Olympic Trials (track and field)